The 2016–17 Basketligan season was the 24th season of the Basketligan, the top tier basketball league on Sweden. The season started on 6 October 2016 and ended on May 10, 2017. Södertälje Kings was the defending champion after achieving its 11th title in the previous season. BC Luleå won the title after beating the defending champions 4–1 in the Finals.

Competition format
The participating teams first play a conventional round-robin schedule with every team playing each opponent three times for a total of 30 games. The top eight teams qualified for the championship playoffs.

Teams

In October 2016, Sundsvall Dragons and Eco Örebro were expelled from the league.

Regular season

Playoffs

References

External links
Official Basketligan website

Basketligan seasons
Sweden
Basketligan